Ponera is a genus of orchids. It contains two currently accepted species, native to Mexico, Guatemala and El Salvador.

Species accepted as of June 2014:

Ponera exilis Dressler - Colima, Jalisco, Guerrero, Mexico State
Ponera juncifolia Lindl. - widespread from Hidalgo to El Salvador

References

External links

photo of herbarium specimen at Missouri Botanical Garden, isotype of Ponera exilis Dressler
IOSPE orchid photos, Ponera juncifolia , Common Name The Reed-Like Leafed Ponera 

Ponerinae (plant)
Orchids of Mexico
Orchids of Central America
Epidendreae genera